Far' Falastine, also known as Branch 235, is a prison operated by Syrian Intelligence under the charge of Brig. Gen. Muhammad Khallouf located in Damascus, notorious for accounts of torture, coercive interrogation, and deplorable conditions related by its former detainees.

The Branch was established in 1969 as the liaison between the Syrian government and the various Palestinian entities permitted to operate in Syria (Fatah, as-Sa'iqa, DFLP, and PFLP). Although it has been associated with torture at least since 1990, the prison gained widespread notoriety in the wake of the September 11 attacks due to detainees suspected of ties to terrorist organizations being sent there through extraordinary renditions, primarily by the United States, as a means of outsourcing torture. The detention center is reportedly quite large, run by some 500 employees, but the majority of the reports regarding torture and abusive interrogation focus on the three underground floors.

Conditions
The cells are described as being the size of a coffin, or 2 by 1.5 meters.

The cells are infested with cockroaches, fleas, rats, mice, and lice. The scarce amount of food given to the prisoners causes extreme weight loss. Prisoners are given one bottle for urine and another for drinking water. Detainees are reportedly allowed out of their cells for a few minutes to use the restroom three times per day, except on Fridays when a longer break is allowed to take a shower and do laundry. Access to the prison yard for natural sunlight is limited to ten minutes per month. Medical care is denied completely as a matter of routine.

Sexual violence
The prison officers frequently threaten sexual violence, particularly gang rape, and occasionally carry it out.

Beating
Methods of torture include the "German chair" (a metal chair frame used to stretch the spine), the "dulab" or "tire method" (in which the prisoner is made to place his head, legs, and arms through a car tire in order to immobilize him while he is beaten by the interrogator), "shabeh" hanging (where the detainee is suspended from the ceiling from by his wrists such that his toes are barely touching the ground), "falaqa" (where the detainee is laid on his back, his legs are lifted at a 90-degree angle, and the soles of his feet are beaten), electrocution, and others.

Former detainees
Maher Arar
Mohammed Haydar Zammar
Abdullah Almalki
Nizar Nayyouf
Abbas Khan
Ahmad El-Maati
Muayyed Nureddin

References

Buildings and structures in Damascus
Prisons in Syria
Torture in Syria
Far' Falastin prisoners